East Kilbride Central South is one of the 20 electoral wards of South Lanarkshire Council. Created in 2007, the ward elects three councillors using the single transferable vote electoral system and covers an area with a population of 16,985 people.

The ward was a Labour stronghold from its creation until 2017 with the party holding two of the three seats. However, it has since become a Scottish National Party (SNP) stronghold with the party holding two of the three seats from 2017 to present.

Boundaries
The ward was created following the Fourth Statutory Reviews of Electoral Arrangements ahead of the 2007 Scottish local elections. As a result of the Local Governance (Scotland) Act 2004, local elections in Scotland would use the single transferable vote electoral system from 2007 onwards so East Kilbride Central South was formed from an amalgamation of several previous first-past-the-post wards. It contained the majority of the former Headhouse, part of the former Hairmyres/Crosshouse, Heatheryknowe and Westwoodhill wards as well as all of the former Duncanrig ward. As the name suggests, its territory covers the parts of East Kilbride just south of the town centre which includes Birniehill, Murrayhill, The Murray, Westwood and Westwoodhill with the northern boundary being the Queensway (A726) dual carriageway. Following the Fifth Statutory Reviews of Electoral Arrangements ahead of the 2017 Scottish local elections, a few streets around Owen Avenue and Dale Avenue which had always generally been considered to belong to The Murray neighbourhood were moved from East Kilbride South to East Kilbride Central South.

Councillors

Election results

2022 election

2017 election

2012 election

2007 election

Notes

References

Wards of South Lanarkshire
East Kilbride